Let's Talk is the third studio album by South Korean boyband, 2AM. The album was released on October 30, 2014, preceded by the singles "Days Like Today" and "Over the Destiny." It was the group's first album released under JYP Entertainment after their departure in 2009, though they would once again separate from the label the following year.

Track listing

Reception
The album sold over 7,835 copies in Korea, and peaked at number six at the Gaon Chart.

References

2014 albums
JYP Entertainment albums
Korean-language albums
2AM (band) albums